Tareh-ye Nishkarhaft Tappeh (also Romanized as Ţareḥ-ye Nīshkarhaft Tappeh) is a village in Hoseynabad Rural District, in the Central District of Shush County, Khuzestan Province, Iran. At the 2006 census, its population was 58, in 9 families.

References 

Populated places in Shush County